Bajarwala is a small village of Gujrat District in the province of Punjab, Pakistan. Bajarwala is located near the town of Dinga and its latitude and longitude is 32°65'31N, 73°68'27E. Bajarwala is about 140 km from the capital city of Islamabad.

Education 

The literacy rate of Bajarwala is more than 95%. There are two primary schools and one girls high school. There is also Madrasah for girls where totally free education is offered.

Politics 

There are approximately 962 voters in Bajarwala. In previous election most votes were cast for PML(Q) and PML(N) and PTI .

Populated places in Gujrat District